Den Pandrevome (Greek: Δεν Παντρεύομαι; English: I am not getting married) is the first Greek-language album and third studio album overall by Greek singer-songwriter and record producer Nikos Karvelas, released by PolyGram Greece in 1985.

Track listing

External links 
 Official site

1985 albums
Albums produced by Nikos Karvelas
Greek-language albums
Nikos Karvelas albums
Universal Music Greece albums